Sword of Orion is a Big Finish Productions audio drama based on the long-running British science fiction television series Doctor Who. This audio drama was broadcast on BBC 7 in four weekly parts starting from 3 September 2005, and was repeated in 2006. The story is adapted from the Audio Visuals audio drama of the same name.

Cast
The Doctor — Paul McGann
Charley Pollard — India Fisher
Thinnes — Mark Gatiss
Digly — Barnaby Edwards
Ike — Ian Marr
Grash — Bruce Montague
Vol — Hylton Collins
Deeva Jansen — Michelle Livingstone
Chev — Helen Goldwyn
Kelsey — Toby Longworth
Cybermen — Nicholas Briggs, Alistair Lock

Outside references
The play's name refers to the stars in the constellation of Orion that form the figure's sword.  In the play, it also refers to a secret military project.

External links
Big Finish Productions - Sword of Orion

2001 audio plays
Eighth Doctor audio plays
Radio plays based on Doctor Who
Cybermen audio plays
2005 radio dramas
Audio plays by Nicholas Briggs
Fiction set in the 26th century